Della Sowah (born 23 November 1959) is a Ghanaian former Deputy Minister for Gender, Children and Social Protection. She is also the Member of Parliament for Kpando constituency.

Early life 
Sowah was born in Kpandu, Volta Region of Ghana on 23 November 1959.

Education 
Sowah earned her degree in Social Sciences from the Kwame Nkrumah University of Science and Technology in 1981. She holds a Diploma in Finance and Master of business administration.

Career
 Deputy Minister
 Member of Parliament, 2012–2016 (government of Ghana)
 Partner, financial planner, 2001–2012 (Speed Masters)
 Marketing, MD, 1990–2000 (DAPEG LTD)
 Research, 1986–1990 (ESSOR LTD)

Personal life 
Sowah is a Christian. She is married, and has three children.

References 

Living people
1959 births
21st-century Ghanaian women politicians
Kwame Nkrumah University of Science and Technology alumni
National Democratic Congress (Ghana) politicians
Women members of the Parliament of Ghana
Ghanaian MPs 2009–2013
Ghanaian MPs 2013–2017
Ghanaian MPs 2017–2021
Ghanaian MPs 2021–2025